Bromine (35Br) has two stable isotopes, 79Br and 81Br, and 32 known radioisotopes, the most stable of which is 77Br, with a half-life of 57.036 hours.

List of isotopes 

|-
| 68Br
| style="text-align:right" | 35
| style="text-align:right" | 33
| 67.95836(28)#
| ~50 ns
| p
| 67Se
| 3+#
|
|
|-
| 69Br
| style="text-align:right" | 35
| style="text-align:right" | 34
| 68.95011(11)#
| <24 ns
| p
| 68Se
| 1/2−#
|
|
|-
| 70Br
| style="text-align:right" | 35
| style="text-align:right" | 35
| 69.94479(33)#
| 79.1(8) ms
| β+
| 70Se
| 0+#
|
|
|-
| rowspan=2 style="text-indent:1em" | 70mBr
| rowspan=2 colspan="3" style="text-indent:2em" | 2292.2(8) keV
| rowspan=2|2.2(2) s
| β+
| 70Se
| rowspan=2|(9+)
| rowspan=2|
| rowspan=2|
|-
| IT
| 70Br
|-
| 71Br
| style="text-align:right" | 35
| style="text-align:right" | 36
| 70.93874(61)
| 21.4(6) s
| β+
| 71Se
| (5/2)−
|
|
|-
| 72Br
| style="text-align:right" | 35
| style="text-align:right" | 37
| 71.93664(6)
| 78.6(24) s
| β+
| 72Se
| 1+
|
|
|-
| rowspan=2 style="text-indent:1em" | 72mBr
| rowspan=2 colspan="3" style="text-indent:2em" | 100.92(3) keV
| rowspan=2|10.6(3) s
| IT (>99.9%)
| 72Br
| rowspan=2|1−
| rowspan=2|
| rowspan=2|
|-
| β+ (<0.1%)
| 72Se
|-
| 73Br
| style="text-align:right" | 35
| style="text-align:right" | 38
| 72.93169(5)
| 3.4(2) min
| β+
| 73Se
| 1/2−
|
|
|-
| 74Br
| style="text-align:right" | 35
| style="text-align:right" | 39
| 73.929891(16)
| 25.4(3) min
| β+
| 74Se
| (0−)
|
|
|-
| style="text-indent:1em" | 74mBr
| colspan="3" style="text-indent:2em" | 13.58(21) keV
| 46(2) min
| β+
| 74Se
| 4(+#)
|
|
|-
| 75Br
| style="text-align:right" | 35
| style="text-align:right" | 40
| 74.925776(15)
| 96.7(13) min
| β+
| 75Se
| 3/2−
|
|
|-
| 76Br
| style="text-align:right" | 35
| style="text-align:right" | 41
| 75.924541(10)
| 16.2(2) h
| β+
| 76Se
| 1−
|
|
|-
| rowspan=2 style="text-indent:1em" | 76mBr
| rowspan=2 colspan="3" style="text-indent:2em" | 102.58(3) keV
| rowspan=2|1.31(2) s
| IT (99.4%)
| 76Br
| rowspan=2|(4)+
| rowspan=2|
| rowspan=2|
|-
| β+ (0.6%)
| 76Se
|-
| 77Br
| style="text-align:right" | 35
| style="text-align:right" | 42
| 76.921379(3)
| 57.036(6) h
| β+
| 77Se
| 3/2−
|
|
|-
| style="text-indent:1em" | 77mBr
| colspan="3" style="text-indent:2em" | 105.86(8) keV
| 4.28(10) min
| IT
| 77Br
| 9/2+
|
|
|-
| rowspan=2|78Br
| rowspan=2 style="text-align:right" | 35
| rowspan=2 style="text-align:right" | 43
| rowspan=2|77.921146(4)
| rowspan=2|6.46(4) min
| β+ (99.99%)
| 78Se
| rowspan=2|1+
| rowspan=2|
| rowspan=2|
|-
| β− (0.01%)
| 78Kr
|-
| style="text-indent:1em" | 78mBr
| colspan="3" style="text-indent:2em" | 180.82(13) keV
| 119.2(10) µs
|
|
| (4+)
|
|
|-
| 79Br
| style="text-align:right" | 35
| style="text-align:right" | 44
| 78.9183371(22)
| colspan=3 align=center|Stable
| 3/2−
| 0.5069(7)
|
|-
| style="text-indent:1em" | 79mBr
| colspan="3" style="text-indent:2em" | 207.61(9) keV
| 4.86(4) s
| IT
| 79Br
| (9/2+)
|
|
|-
| rowspan=2|80Br
| rowspan=2 style="text-align:right" | 35
| rowspan=2 style="text-align:right" | 45
| rowspan=2|79.9185293(22)
| rowspan=2|17.68(2) min
| β− (91.7%)
| 80Kr
| rowspan=2|1+
| rowspan=2|
| rowspan=2|
|-
| β+ (8.3%)
| 80Se
|-
| style="text-indent:1em" | 80mBr
| colspan="3" style="text-indent:2em" | 85.843(4) keV
| 4.4205(8) h
| IT
| 80Br
| 5−
|
|
|-
| 81Br
| style="text-align:right" | 35
| style="text-align:right" | 46
| 80.9162906(21)
| colspan=3 align=center|Stable
| 3/2−
| 0.4931(7)
|
|-
| style="text-indent:1em" | 81mBr
| colspan="3" style="text-indent:2em" | 536.20(9) keV
| 34.6(28) µs
|
|
| 9/2+
|
|
|-
| 82Br
| style="text-align:right" | 35
| style="text-align:right" | 47
| 81.9168041(21)
| 35.282(7) h
| β−
| 82Kr
| 5−
|
|
|-
| rowspan=2 style="text-indent:1em" | 82mBr
| rowspan=2 colspan="3" style="text-indent:2em" | 45.9492(10) keV
| rowspan=2|6.13(5) min
| IT
| 82Br
| rowspan=2|2−
| rowspan=2|
| rowspan=2|
|-
| β−
| 82Kr
|-
| 83Br
| style="text-align:right" | 35
| style="text-align:right" | 48
| 82.915180(5)
| 2.40(2) h
| β−
| 83Kr
| 3/2−
|
|
|-
| style="text-indent:1em" | 83mBr
| colspan="3" style="text-indent:2em" | 3068.8(6) keV
| 700(100) ns
|
|
| (19/2−)
|
|
|-
| 84Br
| style="text-align:right" | 35
| style="text-align:right" | 49
| 83.916479(16)
| 31.80(8) min
| β−
| 84Kr
| 2−
|
|
|-
| style="text-indent:1em" | 84m1Br
| colspan="3" style="text-indent:2em" | 320(10) keV
| 6.0(2) min
| β−
| 84Kr
| 6−
|
|
|-
| style="text-indent:1em" | 84m2Br
| colspan="3" style="text-indent:2em" | 408.2(4) keV
| <140 ns
|
|
| 1+
|
|
|-
| 85Br
| style="text-align:right" | 35
| style="text-align:right" | 50
| 84.915608(21)
| 2.90(6) min
| β−
| 85Kr
| 3/2−
|
|
|-
| 86Br
| style="text-align:right" | 35
| style="text-align:right" | 51
| 85.918798(12)
| 55.1(4) s
| β−
| 86Kr
| (2−)
|
|
|-
| rowspan=2|87Br
| rowspan=2 style="text-align:right" | 35
| rowspan=2 style="text-align:right" | 52
| rowspan=2|86.920711(19)
| rowspan=2|55.65(13) s
| β− (97.48%)
| 87Kr
| rowspan=2|3/2−
| rowspan=2|
| rowspan=2|
|-
| β−, n (2.52%)
| 86Kr
|-
| rowspan=2|88Br
| rowspan=2 style="text-align:right" | 35
| rowspan=2 style="text-align:right" | 53
| rowspan=2|87.92407(4)
| rowspan=2|16.29(6) s
| β− (93.42%)
| 88Kr
| rowspan=2|(2−)
| rowspan=2|
| rowspan=2|
|-
| β−, n (6.48%)
| 87Kr
|-
| style="text-indent:1em" | 88mBr
| colspan="3" style="text-indent:2em" | 272.7(3) keV
| 5.4(7) µs
|
|
|
|
|
|-
| rowspan=2|89Br
| rowspan=2 style="text-align:right" | 35
| rowspan=2 style="text-align:right" | 54
| rowspan=2|88.92639(6)
| rowspan=2|4.40(3) s
| β− (86.2%)
| 89Kr
| rowspan=2|(3/2−,5/2−)
| rowspan=2|
| rowspan=2|
|-
| β−, n (13.8%)
| 88Kr
|-
| rowspan=2|90Br
| rowspan=2 style="text-align:right" | 35
| rowspan=2 style="text-align:right" | 55
| rowspan=2|89.93063(8)
| rowspan=2|1.91(1) s
| β− (74.8%)
| 90Kr
| rowspan=2|
| rowspan=2|
| rowspan=2|
|-
| β−, n (25.2%)
| 89Kr
|-
| rowspan=2|91Br
| rowspan=2 style="text-align:right" | 35
| rowspan=2 style="text-align:right" | 56
| rowspan=2|90.93397(8)
| rowspan=2|541(5) ms
| β− (80%)
| 91Kr
| rowspan=2|3/2−#
| rowspan=2|
| rowspan=2|
|-
| β−, n (20%)
| 90Kr
|-
| rowspan=2|92Br
| rowspan=2 style="text-align:right" | 35
| rowspan=2 style="text-align:right" | 57
| rowspan=2|91.93926(5)
| rowspan=2|0.343(15) s
| β− (66.9%)
| 92Kr
| rowspan=2|(2−)
| rowspan=2|
| rowspan=2|
|-
| β−, n (33.1%)
| 91Kr
|-
| rowspan=2|93Br
| rowspan=2 style="text-align:right" | 35
| rowspan=2 style="text-align:right" | 58
| rowspan=2|92.94305(32)#
| rowspan=2|102(10) ms
| β− (89%)
| 93Kr
| rowspan=2|3/2−#
| rowspan=2|
| rowspan=2|
|-
| β−, n (11%)
| 92Kr
|-
| rowspan=2|94Br
| rowspan=2 style="text-align:right" | 35
| rowspan=2 style="text-align:right" | 59
| rowspan=2|93.94868(43)#
| rowspan=2|70(20) ms
| β− (70%)
| 94Kr
| rowspan=2|
| rowspan=2|
| rowspan=2|
|-
| β−, n (30%)
| 93Kr
|-
| 95Br
| style="text-align:right" | 35
| style="text-align:right" | 60
| 94.95287(54)#
| 50# ms [>300 ns]
|
|
| 3/2−#
|
|
|-
| 96Br
| style="text-align:right" | 35
| style="text-align:right" | 61
| 95.95853(75)#
| 20# ms [>300 ns]
|
|
|
|
|
|-
| 97Br
| style="text-align:right" | 35
| style="text-align:right" | 62
| 96.96280(86)#
| 10# ms [>300 ns]
|
|
| 3/2−#
|
|
|-
| 98Br
| style="text-align:right" | 35
| style="text-align:right" | 63
| 
| 
|
|
| 
|
|
|-
| 101Br
| style="text-align:right" | 35
| style="text-align:right" | 66
| 
| 
|
|
| 
|
|

References 

 Isotope masses from:

 Isotopic compositions and standard atomic masses from:

 Half-life, spin, and isomer data selected from the following sources.

 
Bromine
Bromine